Kantou is a village in the Limassol District of Cyprus, located 2 km north of Erimi. Prior to 1960, the village was almost exclusively inhabited by Turkish Cypriots.

Culture, sports, and tourism
Turkish Cypriot Çanakkale Sports Club was founded in 1963, and now in Cyprus Turkish Football Association (CTFA) K-PET 2nd League.

References

Communities in Limassol District